Manthali may refer to:

Manthali, Ramechhap, Nepal
Manthali, Makwanpur, Nepal